Group B of the 2014–15 EuroChallenge consisted of EGIS Körmend, CS Energia Târgu Jiu, Tartu University Rock, and Lukoil Academic. Play began on 4 November and ended on 16 December 2014.

Teams

Standings

Statistical leaders

References

Group B
2014–15 in Estonian basketball
2014–15 in Romanian basketball
2014–15 in Bulgarian basketball
2014–15 in Hungarian basketball